Peter Byard Davis (born 25 April 1947) is a New Zealand sociologist, professor, and the husband of Helen Clark, who was the Prime Minister of New Zealand from 1999 to 2008.

Early life
Davis was born in Milford on Sea, Hampshire, England, on 25 April 1947, and spent his childhood in Tanzania, where his father worked for a mining company. His father was born in China and his mother in India, but a great-great-grandfather had grown up in New Zealand. Davis gained a master's degree in sociology and statistics at the London School of Economics. He moved to New Zealand in 1970 to work at the University of Canterbury and completed a PhD at the University of Auckland. He became a naturalised New Zealander in 1972. He was part of a team investigating oral health in New Zealand and was joint editor of the Australian and New Zealand Journal of Sociology. In 1976 he was appointed a lecturer at the University of Auckland school of medicine.

In 1980 he stood unsuccessfully for the Auckland City Council on a Labour Party ticket.

Personal life
Davis met Clark, then a political-science lecturer at Auckland, in 1977 and they married in 1981.

Career
Davis specialises in medical sociology, and from 2004 to 2017 worked as the Director of the COMPASS (Centre of Methods and Policy Application in the Social Sciences) Research Centre at the University of Auckland. He is now Professor Emeritus in the School of Population Health and Honorary Professor in the Department of Statistics at the University of Auckland. Previously he served as Professor of Public Health at the University of Otago's Christchurch School of Medicine.

He has previously served on the Auckland Area Health Board, and was a representative in 1989 when his wife (Health Minister at the time) suspended that body. Davis has achieved international recognition in his field, having worked as a consultant for the World Health Organization.

In 2019 Davis became a City Vision candidate for the Auckland District Health Board and was subsequently elected.

He is Chair of The Helen Clark Foundation board.

Notes

References
 University of Auckland- press release 
 Wayne Thompson: "PM's spouse eases long-distance stress" in The New Zealand Herald, Friday 6 February 2004
 University of Auckland profile
 Professores Emeriti of the University of Auckland

1947 births
Alumni of the London School of Economics
Alumni of the University of Southampton
English emigrants to New Zealand
Helen Clark
Living people
Medical sociologists
Naturalised citizens of New Zealand
People from Milford on Sea
Sociology educators
Spouses of prime ministers of New Zealand
University of Auckland alumni
Academic staff of the University of Auckland
Academic staff of the University of Otago
Auckland District Health Board members